Heidolsheim is a commune in the extreme south of the Bas-Rhin department in Alsace in north-eastern France.

Geography
Heidolsheim is positioned to the south-east of Sélestat, slightly more than half way towards Marckolsheim across the rich alluvial farmland that in eastern Alsace fringes the left bank of the Rhine.   Adjacent communes include Hessenheim to the north-east and Ohnenheim to the south.

History
Celtic tombs containing items of prehistoric jewelry such as bronze bracelets have been found nearby.

From the early years of recorded history, the name Hodulsesheimen was used to identify the settlement in 747 and Haidulfesheim in 801.

Personalities
The Anabaptist preacher Jakob Ammann, whose name was adopted by the Amish fellowships, lived in Heidolsheim between 1693 and 1695.

See also
 Communes of the Bas-Rhin department

References

Communes of Bas-Rhin
Bas-Rhin communes articles needing translation from French Wikipedia